KJMU (1340 AM) is a radio station licensed to serve Sand Springs, Oklahoma.  The station is owned by Birach Broadcasting Corp.

The station has been assigned these call letters by the Federal Communications Commission since July 23, 2007.

History
KJMU's format history includes Country, Top-40 and Alternative Rock as KTOW. The format was later switched to Urban Gospel as "Love Radio 1340" under KTOW calls, later changed to KTFX. The station aired an Urban Adult Contemporary format as "Hot 1340 The Groove" under an LMA (Local Management Agreement) with Hardman Broadcasting, later changing to a Spanish format as "La Ley 1340" for a short time under Davidson Media ownership. Following several years of silence, KJMU returned to the air in 2021 with an urban Gospel format.

Ownership
In November 2007, a deal was reached to sell KJMU and sister station KTUV to Birach Broadcasting Corp. (Sima Birach, president) for a reported sale price of $1.5 million.

References

External links

JMU
Birach Broadcasting Corporation stations